The 2008–09 Primera Divisió was the fourteenth season of top-tier football in Andorra. It began on 21 September 2008 and ended on 7 May 2009. FC Santa Coloma were the defending champions.

Competition format
The participating teams first played a conventional round-robin schedule with every team playing each opponent once home and once away for a total of 14 games. The league was then split up in two groups of four teams with each of them playing teams within their group a home-and-away cycle of games. The top four teams competed for the championship. The bottom four clubs played out one direct relegation spot and one relegation play-off spot. Records earned in the First Round were taken over to the respective Second Rounds.

Promotion and relegation
Casa Estrella del Benfica were relegated after the last season due to finishing in 8th place. They were replaced by Segona Divisió champions UE Santa Coloma.

Further, UE Engordany and Segona Divisió runners-up UE Extremenya played a two-legged relegation play-off. Engordany kept their spot in Primera Divisió by winning 5–3 on aggregate.

First round

Second round

Championship Round

Relegation round

Relegation play-offs
Inter Club d'Escaldes competed in a two-legged relegation play-off against Atlètic Club d'Escaldes, runners-up from Segona Divisió, for one spot in 2009–10 Primera Divisió. Inter successfully retained their Primera Divisió spot after winning on penalties 10–9.

External links
 Official site 

Primera Divisió seasons
Andorra
1